Interstate 581 (I-581) is a spur off I-81 into Roanoke, Virginia, completely overlapping US Route 220 (US 220). It is planned to be connected to I-73. Future I-73 Corridor signs are marked on I-581 on the southbound side just after exit 2.

Route description

The I-581 designation ends at the Elm Avenue (State Route 24 (SR 24)) interchange in downtown Roanoke, where US 220 continues south as the Roy L. Webber Expressway.  I-581 was constructed as a six lane highway for its entire length and has not been widened in its history.

Many of I-581's exits are cloverleaf interchanges, which results in weaving. The northern terminus has short merge areas with I-81, particularly the left-lane southbound merge.

Roanoke–Blacksburg Regional Airport, Valley View Mall, and Berglund Center are all located adjacent to I-581. The Hershberger Road (SR 101) exit has become a focus of development. In addition to Valley View, two large hotels were constructed in the early 1980s with another group of hotels being constructed from the mid-1990s through the present. In 2002, local CBS affiliate WDBJ constructed its new facility, designed to broadcast in HDTV, on Hershberger Road near I-581.

The southern end of I-581 offers views of the downtown Roanoke skyline, most prominently the Hotel Roanoke, the Wells Fargo Tower, the former Roanoke Shops of Norfolk Southern Railway, the Norfolk Southern tower, and St. Andrews Catholic Church. The Roanoke Star is also clearly visible.

Future
The road is planned to become part of an extension of I-73 in Virginia.

History

Roy L. Webber Expressway
US 220 continues as a four lane arterial road south of the SR 419 interchange. Since the extension was not constructed to full Interstate Highway standards, it only carried the US 220 designation and was named the Roy L. Webber Expressway after a former mayor of Roanoke. The primary interchange along the expressway is at Wonju Street, which links Franklin Road (US 220 Business [US 220 Bus]) and Colonial Avenue and Brandon Avenue (US 11). This exit provides quick access to downtown Roanoke from residential areas in southwest Roanoke. Wonju Street is named after Wonju, South Korea, one of Roanoke's sister cities. The expressway was originally constructed with four lanes but was widened to six lanes in the mid-1990s.

Exit list

References

External links

Virginia Highways Project: I-581
Virginia @ AARoads.com - Interstate 581
Roads to the Future: Interstate 581 in Virginia

81-5
81-5 Virginia
Interstate 581
Interstate 581
5